Koford's grass mouse (Akodon kofordi) is a species of rodent in the family Cricetidae.
It is found only in Peru. It is named after American biologist Carl B. Koford.

References

Musser, G. G. and M. D. Carleton. 2005. Superfamily Muroidea. pp. 894–1531 in Mammal Species of the World a Taxonomic and Geographic Reference. D. E. Wilson and D. M. Reeder eds. Johns Hopkins University Press, Baltimore.

Akodon
Mammals described in 1989
Taxonomy articles created by Polbot